AeroTal (Colombian Territorial Airlines, formerly as the Airlines El Llanero) was a Colombian airline based in the La Vanguardia Airport of Villavicencio. The airline specialized in both regional, domestic and international flights. It was founded in 1970 and completed its entire operations by 1983.

History 
On the initiative of Victor Manuel Ferrucho, AeroTal was created and was based in Villavicencio. The objective was to make non-scheduled flights to Meta. He started with one Cessna 206 and one Piper PA-21. Then, with the closure of the Avianca base in the town of Villavicencio, it was decided by the AeroTal board to expand their route chart and retake destinations abandoned by the rival company Avianca.

In 1974, a bunch of Douglas DC-3 airplanes were also purchased to operate to new destinations. Those Douglas DC-3s were bought from AVIANCA and a new base of operations was made in Bogota. A year later, LAN Airlines Sud Aviation Caravelle aircraft were acquired by AeroTal to operate the busiest routes of the company in Arauca and Leticia.
When there was specific transport of cargo, international charter flights were made, which in turn made the possibility of replacing the DC-4 with larger planes to cover for the mass international routes it had at that current time. At that time, the AeroTal board had no interest whatsoever in generating flights to the Eastern Plains. However they planned to make flights to the Eastern Plains when they started off in 1970 to make flights there.

That very same year the main trunk routes began to operate, such as Cali, San Andres, among other routes. It was also decided by the AeroTal company board to suspend operations in Leticia to use the new jets on trunk air routes.
Three years later, a fourth Sud Aviation Caravelle was incorporated to AeroTal's fleet to accommodate for the enormous demand for the trunk air routes. That was when AeroTal changed its name to "Colombian Territorial Airlines". Then in 1979 the Civil Aeronautics Board (CAB) authorized cargo flights to Miami, for which a Boeing 707 was acquired through Leasing.

At the beginning of the early eighties, the company started getting routes to Pereira and Medellín. They were improving their markets greatly during that time and their position in the domestic market. When Aerocondor Colombia ceased operations, the airline saw the possibility of expanding. The company then ordered 720 and 727 aircraft, which operated on the companies most important routes. In 1981, promotions never before seen in Colombia were launched, with which tariff schemes were broken. These gave the idea of starting to operate passenger flights to Miami, temporarily from Barranquilla, Bogotá, Medellín and San Andrés.

AeroTal crisis and bankruptcy
AeroTal's first major problems began with a series of hijackings, some of their 727 and several of their Boeing 727s. The latter had been warned in a statement by Boeing, which mentioned problems with the ailerons and the rudder, leaks in the hydraulic and fuel system. Then in 1983, there was a financial crisis in some banks and that caused AeroTal to suspend a lot of its operations to cease. During that time the company had to receive significant financial aid. Also during that period there was a restructuring of AeroTal executives, and Avianca was requested to cover the airline's routes temporarily.

After the brief period the company was out of service from operating it. The company was unable to order or get any spare parts for its aircraft. In addition to not having any spare parts, the company was out of workers since they couldn't pay them. So most of the workers went another other line of work or went to work at Avianca. Due to these problems, it was decided by the AeroTal company board to hire the former employees of Aerocóndor. But the problem was not the lack of staff, but the lack of budget.

Finally, due to serious debts, AeroTal operations were permanently suspended because of everything that happened in those early eighties.

After the bankruptcy of AeroTal, irregularities were discovered in the operation of the company, as well as invalid procedures to take the aircraft to other countries. So the company if it was in service it would´ve been severely fined and probably taken out service either way.

Revival of the company
In the year 1984, the president of the company, Hugo Salguero, presented a plan to the AeroTal company board to save the company. It included renting a Boeing 727 to the company Avianca. Another Boeing 727 was also loaned to ACES. It was also planned to operate the Caravelle taken from the fleet years ago. However, this project did not work.

Again in 1988 a new plan was created to recover the liquidated company. The way to cover the old debts and supply the public needs was sought, since at that time Avianca had suspended its cargo flights to United States. Unfortunately, this new plan also failed. So by the end of the eighties all efforts to revive the company ended and the company was put to rest.

Destinations 

 Aguaclara  
 Arauca / Santiago Pérez Quiroz Airport
 Barranquilla / Ernesto Cortissoz International Airport
 Bocas del Pauto
 Bogotá / El Dorado International Airport
 Bucaramanga / Palonegro International Airport
 Cali / Alfonso Bonilla Aragón International Airport 
 Cartagena / Rafael Núñez International Airport
 Cúcuta / Camilo Daza International Airport
 El Totumo 
 Florencia / Gustavo Artunduaga Paredes Airport
 La Hermosa 
 La Macarena / La Macarena Airport
 La Primavera 
 Laureles 
 Leticia / Alfredo Vásquez Cobo International Airport
 Medellín / Olaya Herrera Airport
 Monterrey 
 Orocué 
 Pasto / Antonio Nariño Airport
 Paz de Ariporo  
 Pereira / Matecaña International Airport
 Puerto Carreño  
 Puerto Inírida 
 Puerto Leguízamo 
 Rondón 
 San Andrés Island / Gustavo Rojas Pinilla International Airport
 San José del Guaviare 
 San Luis de Palenque 
 San Pedro de Jagua 
 San Vicente del Caguán 
 Santa Marta / Simón Bolívar International Airport (Colombia)
 Santa Rosalía 
 Saravena / Los Colonizadores Airport
 Tame / Gabriel Vargas Santos Airport
 Trinidad 
 Villanueva 
 Villavicencio / La Vanguardia Airport
 Yopal / El Alcaraván Airport

 Oranjestad / Queen Beatrix International Airport

 Panamá / Tocumen International Airport

 Miami / Miami International Airport

 Caracas / Simón Bolívar International Airport (Venezuela)

See also 
 List of defunct airlines of Colombia
 La Vanguardia Airport
 List of airlines of Colombia

Fleet 
 Boeing 707-320C
 Boeing 707-320F
 Boeing 720B
 Boeing 727-100
 Cessna 206 Stationair
 Douglas DC-3A
 Douglas DC-4
 Piper 21 Apache
 Piper PA-32 Cherokee
 Sud Aviation Caravelle

References

External links 
 Aerolíneas Territoriales de Colombia en Aviacol.net
 Fotos de Aerotal en Airliners.net

Defunct airlines of Colombia
Airlines established in 1970
Airlines disestablished in 1983
Colombian companies established in 1970
1983 disestablishments in Colombia
Defunct companies of Colombia